The Stampede Trail is a remote road and trail located in the Denali Borough in the U.S. state of Alaska. The route ends at an abandoned antimony mine at  along Stampede Creek, a couple miles past Stampede Airport's grass airstrip.

Historically, access to the east end of the trail was gained from the Alaska Railroad. Today, the primary access to the trail is from the George Parks Highway (Alaska Route 3) which opened in the early 1970s.  The Parks Highway intersects the trail at milepost 251.1, two miles north of the center of Healy.  Though this intersection marks the present-day eastern terminus of the Stampede Road, Lignite Road continues a few miles east from this intersection to the railroad tracks and the Nenana River.

The trail is located near the northern boundary of Denali National Park in a small finger of State of Alaska public land that extends into the national park. The valley, known as the Stampede Valley or the Stampede Corridor, is mostly low-lying tundra and watersheds.

The Stampede Trail has been the subject of international attention since the 1992 death of Christopher McCandless, whose remains were found in an abandoned bus deep inside the wilderness about 28 miles down the trail. The bus was first brought to the public's attention by writer Jon Krakauer in an Outside magazine article; a book in 1996 and a film in 2007 followed. This made the trail popular among hikers, some unprepared for the rugged conditions, resulting in several rescue operations and even some deaths. In 2020, citing safety reasons, the bus was removed and shipped to the University of Alaska Museum of the North.

The trail currently receives limited tour traffic. In 2015, Alaska Travel Adventures stopped operating Jeep tours along the trail due to deteriorating trail conditions and frequent mechanical problems. Denali Tundra Tours ceased operations of an Argo tour in 2016. As of 2019, Stampede Excursions continues to operate three daily tours along the trail in Pinzgauer 6x6 military grade trucks as well as Volvo C306 6x6 personnel carriers. This tour is called the Denali Backcountry Safari. While they pick up passengers from all Denali area hotels, the 6x6 tours actually begin at their Eight Mile Lake Base Camp at mile 7.5 of the Stampede Road. Their pavilion and other associated buildings are the last permanent structures along the Stampede Road. All tours turn around a few miles east of the Savage River. Traversing the beaver ponds, "mud flats,” and crossing the Teklanika River are major obstacles preventing most vehicles from continuing more than 5 miles or so down the trail.

During the fall, hunting traffic along the trail is heavy as the area is prime habitat for moose.  Many hunters use ATVs or Argos to access hunting camps. Moose hunting in this area generally yields high success rates. Winter travel by snowmobile, dog sled, or tracked vehicle is much easier than summer travel after the boggy tundra, beaver ponds, and rivers freeze.

History
The Stampede Trail began as the "Lignite to Kantishna" mining trail blazed in 1903 by prospectors drawn to the Kantishna region by the discovery of placer gold. For many years, the mine was accessed through the use of a winter trail. Antimony ore was shipped east to the railroad through the use of “Cat Trains,” sleds loaded with ore and towed by Caterpillar Bulldozers. Fuel and supplies for the mine were backhauled in the same way. The overland cat trains could take 3 or more days of travel time and February was generally the best month for such winter trail travel.

In 1960, Yutan Construction won a contract from the new state of Alaska to upgrade the trail as part of Alaska's Pioneer Road Program, building a road for trucks to haul ore from the mine year-round for transshipment to the railroad at Lignite (near the present day town of Healy.) Construction was discontinued in 1961 after only  of road were built. No bridges were constructed over the several rivers it crossed. In 1963 maintenance was halted and the route promptly became impassable for road vehicles by the soft permafrost and seasonal flooding.

The trail has since been used by backcountry travelers on foot, bicycle, dog sleds,  snowmachines, and all-terrain vehicles. The trail's main obstacle is crossing the Teklanika River during the summer months when the river swells with snowmelt. The Alaska State Troopers report that several rescues were necessary every year at the river crossing. In August 2010, high water resulted in the drowning death of Claire Ackermann, a hiker from Switzerland and in July 2019 Veranika Nikanava of Belarus was also swept downstream and drowned. Hundreds of hikers attempted to reach Bus 142 every year, until its removal in June 2020.

Bus 142

From the 1970s until 2020, an abandoned bus sat on the Stampede Trail near Denali National Park, and became a destination for visitors. It was originally one of three buses used by the Yutan Construction Company to provide site accommodations for the construction crew from Fairbanks that worked on road upgrades in 1960–1961. It was towed on location by a Caterpillar D8 bulldozer, as the engine had been removed. It contained a couple of beds and a wood-burning stove. When the Stampede Mine ceased operations in the 1970s, the buses were removed, but Bus 142 was left behind due to a broken rear axle, and subsequently served as a shelter for hunters, trappers, and other visitors.

The bus gained notoriety in January 1993 when Outside magazine published an article written by Jon Krakauer titled "Death of an Innocent" describing the death of Christopher McCandless, an American hitchhiker who lived in the bus during the summer of 1992 while attempting to survive off the Alaskan wilderness, only to die of starvation after three and a half months.

The bus – referred to by McCandless in his journal as the "Magic Bus" – became a pilgrimage site for visitors seeking the location where he perished. The 2007 film version of Jon Krakauer's 1996 book about McCandless, Into the Wild, revived more interest in the bus. In 2013, Dave Gill visited the bus as part of a British documentary publishing project, discovering that visitors had shot at the bus and caused damage, resulting in its accelerated deterioration. In 2017, Circle the Globe Productions filmed a pilot episode for Off the Map – a proposed series on the Travel Channel – along the trail and at the bus.

Two additional hikers died attempting to reach Bus 142. In 2010, Claire Ackermann of Switzerland drowned trying to cross the Teklanika River. She had tied herself to a rope spanning the fast-moving river, but lost her footing and drowned before she could be cut free. In 2019, Veranika Nikanava of Belarus also drowned while trying to cross the river while tied to a rope. Subsequently, hikers were strongly urged to avoid tying themselves to ropes as a method of crossing Alaskan rivers. After Nikanava’s death, her husband is attempting to raise awareness and funds for a cable crossing or bridge at this location.

In June 2020, various government agencies coordinated a training mission with the Alaska Army National Guard to remove the bus, deemed a public safety issue after the deaths of Ackermann and Nikanava and numerous visitor rescue incidents. It was flown out of the wilderness by a CH-47 Chinook helicopter to Healy. The Museum of The North at the University of Alaska in Fairbanks became the new home of Bus 142, where it would be restored and an outdoor exhibit created.

References

External links

 FreeWheelings – Complete Guide to Stampede Trail and Finding the Magic Bus including GPS Coordinates
 A British Documentary visits the Magic Bus  – Hiking The Stampede Trail to the Into The Wild Bus, July 2013.
 Into The Wild Bus Removal – Into The Wild Bus removal report, Alaska Public Media, June 2020.

Geography of Denali Borough, Alaska
Hiking trails in Alaska
Historic trails and roads in Alaska
Transportation in Denali Borough, Alaska